Mekhi Becton (born April 18, 1999) is an American football offensive tackle for the New York Jets of the National Football League (NFL). He played college football at Louisville and was selected by the Jets in the first round of the 2020 NFL Draft.

Early life and high school career
Becton attended Highland Springs High School in Richmond, Virginia. He was regarded as a three-star prospect, ranked as the No. 43 offensive tackle and No. 405 overall recruit in the 247Sports Composite. Becton was recruited by 31 schools to play football, but by February 1, 2017, National Signing Day, he had narrowed the choice to five schools: Louisville, Virginia, Virginia Tech, Michigan, and Oregon. While he had been heavily recruited by Virginia, he ultimately chose Louisville on signing day.

College career

Becton played as a freshman in the 2017 season. During his freshman year, Becton played in 13 games and started 11 for the Cardinals at the tackle position. During the first 4 games of the season, Becton was the highest rated freshman in the country by Pro Football Focus, and during the 7 he was the best pass-blocker in the ACC, allowing only 6 pressures in 312 snaps.

Becton was named a starting tackle for the 2018 season and started every game, bringing his total number of games started to 23 by the end of the season. Becton was again named a starting tackle for the 2019 season.  He received first team All-ACC honors after the conclusion of the regular season. Becton decided to forgo his senior season and sit out Louisville's bowl game, and declared for the 2020 NFL Draft.

Professional career

Becton was selected in the first round with the 11th overall pick by the New York Jets in the 2020 NFL Draft.

On September 12, 2021, Becton suffered an apparent knee injury and was carted off the field. It was revealed that Becton had suffered cartilage damage, which required surgery, putting him out for 4–6 weeks. He was placed on injured reserve on September 14, 2021.

On August 8, 2022, during training camp, Becton was diagnosed with an avulsion fracture of his right kneecap. Eight days later, the Jets placed him on injured reserve, and he missed the entire season.

References

External links 
 New York Jets bio
 Louisville Cardinals bio

1999 births
Living people
People from Highland Springs, Virginia
Players of American football from Virginia
American football offensive tackles
Louisville Cardinals football players
New York Jets players